The 2015 Corrientes Challenger was a professional tennis tournament played on clay courts. It was the inaugural edition of the tournament which was part of the 2015 ATP Challenger Tour. It took place in Corrientes, Argentina between 12 and 18 October 2015.

Singles main-draw entrants

Seeds

 1 Rankings are as of October 12, 2015.

Other entrants
The following players received wildcards into the singles main draw:
  Hernán Casanova
  Juan Pablo Paz
  Manuel Peña López
  Agustín Velotti

The following player received entry into the singles main draw with a protected ranking:
  Pedro Sousa

The following players received entry from the qualifying draw:
  Franco Agamenone
  Martín Cuevas 
  Joris De Loore 
  Ryusei Makiguchi

Champions

Singles

 Máximo González def.  Diego Schwartzman 3–6, 7–5, 6–4.

Doubles

 Julio Peralta /  Horacio Zeballos def.  Guillermo Durán /  Máximo González 6–3, 6–3.

External links
Official Website 

Corrientes Challenger